Pro Cycling Team Fanini was a cycling team founded in 2017, that is based in Albania and registered as a UCI Women's Team.

Team roster

Major results
2018
Stage 1 (ITT) Giro della Campania in Rosa, Elena Franchi
 Young rider classification Giro Toscana Int. Femminile - Memorial Michela Fanini, Elena Franchi

National champions
2017
 Ukraine Time Trial, Yevgenia Vysotska
 Ukraine Road Race, Yevgenia Vysotska

References

External links

Cycling teams established in 2017
UCI Women's Teams
2017 establishments in Albania